Night Eyes 4: Fatal Passion is a 1996 erotic thriller film directed by Rodney McDonald. It is the fourth film in the Night Eyes series. Like the previous films, it stars Andrew Stevens as security expert Will Griffith.

Synopsis
Successful psychologist, Dr. Angela Cross (Paula Barbieri), hires security expert Will Griffith (Andrew Stevens) and his partner, Steve Caldwell (Jeff Trachta), to install a security system in her house, after receiving several death threats. Steve and Angela begin a relationship, which eventually exposes some secrets from her past.

Cast
 Paula Barbieri as Dr. Angela Cross
 Jeff Trachta as Steve Caldwell
 Andrew Stevens as Will Griffith
 Casper Van Dien as Roy

References

External links 
 

1996 films
1990s erotic thriller films
American erotic thriller films
1990s English-language films
Films directed by Rodney McDonald
1990s American films